Abu al-Hasan (or Abu al-Husayn) Bahmanyar ibn al-Marzuban, better simply known as Bahmanyar (died 1066) was an Iranian scholar, who is mainly known as one of the most prominent pupils of Avicenna (d. 1037).

Background 
Bahmanyar was from a Zoroastrian family, reportedly from Azerbaijan in northern Iran. His father may have been the Bavandid prince al-Marzuban, who ruled in Mazandaran in the late 10th-century, and was the author of the Marzban-nama. Bahmanyar's knowledge of Arabic was not perfect.

Life 
Little is known of Bahmanyar's life. He most likely started his studies in philosophy along with Abu al-Qasim al-Kirmani in the Buyid city of Ray in northern Iran. There they both became involved in the administration, while they read Avicenna works. Bahmanyar was possibly part of the Buyid court in Ray through family ties with the Bavandid princess Sayyida Shirin, her husband Fakhr al-Dawla and son Majd al-Dawla, both Buyid rulers of Ray.

Bahmanyar eventually started to interact with Avicenna, which would later result in the latter's creation of the al-Mubāḥathāt ("The Discussions"), which were mainly answers to questions made by Bahmanyar. The work was compiled sometime between 1024–1037, during Avicenna's stay in Isfahan, the capital of the Kakuyid ruler Muhammad ibn Rustam Dushmanziyar. In the work, Bahmanyar is referred to as al-Shaykh al-fāḍil ("the aristocratic gentleman"). Bahmanyar and Avicenna possibly encountered each other in 1014/5 at Ray, when the latter worked for Sayyida Shirin and Majd al-Dawla. 

Bahmanyar's main work, the Kitāb al-taḥṣīl ("The Summation"), which summarises Avicenna's logic, physics and metaphysics was written between 1024 and 1037 and dedicated to his Zoroastrian uncle, Abu Mansur Bahram ibn Khurshid ibn Yazdyar, who was possibly the son of the treasurer of the Buyid emperor Adud al-Dawla. Abu'l-Hasan Bayhaqi (d. 1169) writes that Bahmanyar also wrote a book on logic and one on music and other works are attributed to him.

Beliefs 
Some sources claim that he converted to Islam in his later lifetime, however, the earliest sources of him do not comment on this. His main work Kitāb al-taḥṣīl is ambiguous about his beliefs. While the introduction and conclusion of the book is made in a Muslim manner and character, it is unknown if these were part of the original version of the book or later added by secretaries. However, it is still plausible that he converted to Islam, due to his way of thinking on questions regarding divine unity and the struggle between good and evil, which Bahmanyar places inside the created order, contrary to the Zoroastrian belief that associates it with the divine essence. Furthermore, his kunya Abu al-Husayn may be a possible sign of a conversion to Shia Islam.

References

Sources 

 

 

Former Zoroastrians
Logicians
Writers about music
1066 deaths
Pupils of Avicenna
Year of birth unknown
11th-century Persian-language writers
11th-century Iranian philosophers
Scholars under the Buyid dynasty